is an airport located  northeast Tsushima, a city in the Nagasaki Prefecture of Japan.

Airlines and destinations

History 
The airport opened in 1975 on a site created by leveling a small mountain.

In 2003, a small propeller training aircraft used by Sojo University crashed on approach to Tsushima, killing three occupants.

Scheduled flights to and from the airport use Boeing 737 and Bombardier Dash 8 aircraft. The airport has also been served by Korea Express Air turboprop service from Seoul Gimpo and Daegu.

References

External links
 
 

Airports in Japan
Transport in Nagasaki Prefecture
Buildings and structures in Nagasaki Prefecture